Amber Davies is a Welsh actress and television personality. She is mostly known for winning reality TV show Love Island in 2017. She is also known for appearing in 9 to 5: The Musical as the character of Judy Bernly. Davies has also starred as Campbell Davies in Bring It On: The Musical. Davies is currently appearing in Back To The Future: The Musical as Lorraine Bains McFly at the Adelphi Theatre. Davies has also starred in CBBC series Almost Never as Jess.

Early life 
Davies is from Denbigh, North Wales. Her father is a plumber and her mother is a mental health nurse. In an interview with OK!, Davies stated that she is from a working class background.

Career 
Before appearing on Love Island, Davies gained a scholarship at 16 to train in musical theatre at Urdang Academy in London, following in her sister Jade's footsteps. She worked as a dancer at London nightclub Cirque Le Soir, and participated once on The X Factor before starting her television career professionally.

In 2017, Davies won the third season of Love Island, along with Kem Cetinay. Soon after, she introduced a lingerie range with Boux Avenue. In the same year, she launched a clothing range with Motel Rocks, while acting as an ambassador for the brand.  

Davies has since appeared in several reality shows such as And They're Off!, All Together Now, The One Show, as well as documentaries such as Amber & Dolly: 9 to 5, When Reality TV Goes Horribly Wrong.

Filmography 

2021
Jess in Almost Never series 3, 
Lorraine - ITV

References

External links 
 Amber Davies at IMDb

Living people
People from Denbigh
Year of birth missing (living people)
Love Island (2015 TV series) contestants